Halifax County Airport  was a public use airport located three nautical miles (6 km) southwest of the central business district of Roanoke Rapids, a city in Halifax County, North Carolina, United States. It was owned by the City of Roanoke Rapids. This airport was included in the National Plan of Integrated Airport Systems for 2009–2013, which categorized it as a general aviation facility.

Facilities and aircraft 
This airport KRZZ, is closed. The Halifax Northampton airport KIXA is open. 
 
Halifax County Airport covered an area of 281 acres (114 ha) at an elevation of 256 feet (78 m) above mean sea level. It had two runways: 5/23 is 4,006 by 75 feet (1,221 x 23 m) with an asphalt surface; 16/34 is 2,100 by 150 feet (640 x 46 m) with a turf surface.

For the 12-month period ending August 14, 2007, the airport had 31,500 aircraft operations, an average of 86 per day: 89% general aviation, 7% air taxi, and 4% military. At that time there were 24 aircraft based at this airport: 96% single-engine and 4% multi-engine.

According to recent satellite imagery, it appears the airport is now being used as a solar farm.

See also 
 Halifax-Northampton Regional Airport
 List of airports in North Carolina

References

External links 

  at North Carolina DOT airport guide
 Center for Energy Education Current occupant of the site
 Aerial image as of February 1994 from USGS The National Map

Defunct airports in North Carolina
Airports in North Carolina
Transportation in Halifax County, North Carolina
Buildings and structures in Halifax County, North Carolina